Smith Lake (Athabascan: Tr'exwghodegi Troth Yeddha' Bena') is a lake in Fairbanks, Alaska on the property of the University of Alaska Fairbanks.

The university maintains ecological and hydrological monitoring sites at the lake.

Wildlife 
Smith lake is a good wildlife viewing location.

Bird species found at the lake may include Pacific loons, ring-necked duck, bufflehead, American wigeon, northern pintail, northern shoveler, green-winged teal, red-necked grebe, horned grebe, Bonaparte's gull, Wilson's snipe, lesser yellowlegs, long-billed dowitcher, red-necked phalarope, pectoral sandpiper and Bohemian waxwing.

Recreation
In winter the frozen surface of Smith Lake is popular with ice skaters and cross-country skiers.

Further reading 
Sarah K. Andersen and Daniel M. White (2006). "Determining soil organic matter quality under anaerobic conditions in arctic and subarctic soils". Cold Regions Science and Technology 44(2), 149–158. Research done on the soils at Smith Lake.
University of Alaska Fairbanks Trail System

References

Lakes of Alaska
Bodies of water of Fairbanks North Star Borough, Alaska
University of Alaska Fairbanks